Spree may refer to:

Geography
 Spree (river), river in Germany

Film and television
 The Spree, a 1998 American television film directed by Tommy Lee Wallace
 Spree (film), a 2020 American film starring Joe Keery
 "Spree" (Numbers), an episode of the television show Numbers
 "Spree!", an episode of Hi Hi Puffy AmiYumi
 Spree TV, a former shopping television channel in Australia
 The Spree, a terrorist group of witches in Motherland: Fort Salem

Other uses
 Spree (candy), a type of candy
 Honda Spree, a motor scooter
 Killing spree
 Latrell Sprewell (born 1970), nicknamed "Spree", American basketball player
 Spree Commerce, an open-source e-commerce platform
 SpringSpree, the annual cultural festival of the National Institute of Technology, Warangal, India
 UNSW School of Photovoltaic and Renewable Energy Engineering (SPREE), at the University of New South Wales, Australia

See also
Spree shopping
Shopping spree (disambiguation)